Carmen Raisová (born 7 February 1908, date of death unknown) was a Czech fencer. She competed in the women's individual foil event at the 1936 Summer Olympics.

References

1908 births
Year of death missing
Czech female foil fencers
Czechoslovak female foil fencers
Olympic fencers of Czechoslovakia
Fencers at the 1936 Summer Olympics